A skunked term is a word that becomes difficult to use because it is transitioning from one meaning to another, perhaps inconsistent or even opposite, usage, or a word that becomes difficult to use due to other controversy surrounding the word. Purists may insist on the old usage, while descriptivists may be more open to newer usages. Readers may not know which sense is meant especially when prescriptivists insist on a meaning that accords with interests that often conflict.

The term was coined by lexicographer Bryan A. Garner in Garner's Modern American Usage and has since been adopted by some other style guides.

Usage
Garner recommends avoiding such terms if their use may distract readers from the intended meaning of a text.

Some terms, such as "fulsome", may become skunked, and then eventually revert to their original meaning over time.

Examples

 "Hopefully" used to mean "in a hopeful manner" but has come to mean "it is hoped" since the early 1960s.
 "Niggardly" means "miserly" or "parsimonious", but is rarely used in modern English because it is easily confused with the slur "nigger", despite their separate etymologies.
 Other examples include "Oriental", "data", and "media".
 "Literally" is widely used to mean "figuratively".
 The "deep web" is often confused with the "dark web".
 A "moot point" in British English has historically meant a point that is worth debating, but the meaning is shifting towards that in US English of a point that is irrelevant or academic.
 "Biweekly" has come to mean either "occurring every two weeks" or "occurring twice a week". The same ambiguity exists for the word "bimonthly".
 "Disinterested" is widely used to mean "uninterested" whereas the primary meaning is "unbiased".
"Humbled" originally meant "brought low" but is often used to mean "honored."
"It's all downhill from here" originally meant to become easier but is widely used to mean becoming worse or more difficult.
 "Goat" was used to describe a person who failed a group, often in sports, as a scapegoat. However, in the mid-2010s, the meaning shifted: when someone was referred to as a goat, it was usually understood to be an acronym for "Greatest of All Time". For instance, when Lindsey Jacobellis lost her 2006 Winter Olympics snowboard cross gold medal when she attempted an uneccessary trick and fell in the last 50 meters of the race, she was called The Olympics "first goat." Sixteen years later when she won her first gold at the 2022 Winter Olympics after a storied career, however, she was celebrated as snowboard cross's GOAT.

See also 
Autoantonym

References

Lexicology